Douglas Laird Busk  (1906–1990) was a British diplomat, mountaineer and geographer.

Personal life
Busk was born on 15 July 1906 and educated at Eton and New College, Oxford, also spending some time at Princeton University. He married Bridget Hemsley Thompson in 1937, and they had two daughters. She was an artist and her line drawings illustrate his 1957 book The Fountain of the Sun . He died on 11 December 1990, aged 84, at Chilbolton.

Diplomatic career
Baird joined the diplomatic service in 1927 and served in countries including Iran, Hungary, Japan, Turkey and Iraq. He served as Britain's ambassador to Ethiopia (1952–1956), Finland (1958–1960) and Venezuela (1961–1964).

Mountaineering
Baird was a notable mountaineer, gaining membership of the Alpine Club while an undergraduate, after making the first winter ascent of the north face of Pic du Midi d'Ossau. His obituary in The Times said that his "greatest contribution" was his work as chairman of the library of the Alpine Club, culminating in the production of a 600-page catalogue and the 1981 exhibition "The Treasures of the Alpine Club".

Recognition
Baird was appointed Knight Commander of the Order of St Michael and St George (KCMG) in the 1959 Birthday Honours.

The Royal Geographical Society, of which he was honorary vice-president, awards an annual Busk Medal named in his honour.

References

1906 births
1990 deaths
British geographers
British mountain climbers
Ambassadors of the United Kingdom to Ethiopia
Ambassadors of the United Kingdom to Finland
Ambassadors of the United Kingdom to Venezuela
People educated at Eton College
Alumni of New College, Oxford